The 1960 Panamerican Championship was the third and final edition of Panamerican Championship, an association football tournament featuring national teams from North, Central and South America. It was hosted in San José, Costa Rica, between March 6 and March 20, in 1960. All the matches were held in Estadio Nacional.

Four teams played as a round-robin tournament, it was won by Argentina.

Venue

Final table

Match details

Top goalscorers

References

1960
1960
1959–60 in Mexican football
1960 in Argentine football
1960 in Brazilian football
March 1960 sports events in North America
1960 Pan
20th century in San José, Costa Rica
1960 in Costa Rican sport